BBB & Co. (subtitled Benny, Ben & Barney) is an album by swing musicians Benny Carter, Ben Webster and Barney Bigard recorded in 1962 and originally released by the Swingville label.

Reception

AllMusic awarded the album 4 stars and the review by Scott Yanow stated "All of the swing all-stars are in fine form, making one wish that they were not being so neglected by critics and fans alike during this era; Webster soon left the U.S. permanently for Europe. Although not essential, this set is fun". On NPR Murray Horwitz said "throughout this deceptively simple album... you hear all that musicality in Benny Carter, plus a big dollop of playfulness. It's a wonderfully enjoyable CD"

Track listing
 "Opening Blues" (Leonard Feather) – 10:10
 "Lula" (Benny Carter) – 7:42
 "When Lights Are Low" (Carter, Spencer Williams) – 4:42
 "You Can't Tell the Difference When the Sun Goes Down Blues" (Feather) – 12:05

Personnel 
Benny Carter – alto saxophone, trumpet
Ben Webster – tenor saxophone
Barney Bigard – clarinet
Shorty Sherock – trumpet
Jimmy Rowles – piano
Dave Barbour – guitar
Leroy Vinnegar – bass
Mel Lewis – drums

References 

1962 albums
Benny Carter albums
Ben Webster albums
Swingville Records albums
Albums recorded at Van Gelder Studio